Tizway (foaled on February 17, 2005) is an American Thoroughbred racehorse who won the 2011 Whitney Stakes and Metropolitan Handicap.

Racing career

Early career
Tizway's debut came in a 2-year-old maiden special weight at Aqueduct Racecourse. He came in 6th place and did not run again that year.

As a three-year-old, Tizway did not run in any stakes races. His first 4 races he lost. Out of them his best finish was a third. But on the 5th try Tizway won his first race. He never raced again as a three-year-old.

2009: Four-Year-Old Season
After 10 months of rest, Tizway came in 2nd in his return before winning his 2nd race, an allowance. He ran in the Whitney for the first time. This was also the first time Tizway ran in a stakes race. He ended up in 4th. He also was 3rd in the Jockey Club Gold Cup. In his last race as a 4-year-old, Tizway was entered in the Japan Cup Dirt. He finished 12th.

2010: Five-Year-Old season
Tizway started his 5-year-old campaign on April 23, 2010 with a win in an allowance race at Aqueduct, then finished third in the Metropolitan Handicap on May 31. Unfortunately, he then suffered a small fractured wingbone that Dr. Alan Nixon successfully treated. He did not race again until October 3 in the Kelso Handicap, in which he earned his first graded stakes victory. Jockey Rajiv Maragh said, "He’s always been running against some of the best older horses all over and to finally win like this was very good for him. I definitely wanted to get my horse involved because he seems to run better that way, and when I got to the middle of the turn I felt like still had a lot of horse left. Once I called on him in the stretch he just kicked on and finished up powerfully to the wire." He ended the season by finishing fifth in the Breeders Cup Dirt Mile.

2011: Six-Year-Old Season
Tizway brought the best in himself in his final season. He started the season with third place finishes in the Gulfstream Park Handicap on March 12 and Charles Town Classic on April 16. He then stepped up to Grade I company in the Metropolitan Handicap on May 30. Tracking a fast pace for the first 6 furlongs, he took a commanding lead coming into the stretch and won convincingly by  lengths. The final time of 1:32.90 was just three-fifths of a second off the track record, and less than one-tenth off the stakes record. "He tries every time," said trainer H. James Bond. "He couldn't stand up on that stuff at Charles Town and still ran a game third and just missed second. Like I say, I'm just fortunate enough to have him in my barn."

On August 6, Tizway faced multiple Grade 1 winners in the Whitney Handicap, at a distance ( miles) in which he had only 1 win in 8 starts. At the beginning of the race, Tizway bolted out of the gate and went to the lead, but he then settled behind Friend or Foe and Morning Line. When they hit the far turn, Tizway took command and easily held off Flat Out to win by three lengths. The decisive victory marked Tizway as the interim leader of the 2011 older horse division.

Unfortunately, Tizway developed a ligament injury while training for the Breeders' Cup Classic and was subsequently retired.

End of career statistics
At the end of his career, Tizway had an overall career record of 20-7-1-5 and total earnings of $1,359,274. He was an Eclipse Award finalist for 2011 champion older horse, finishing third behind Acclamation with 52 votes.

Stud record
Tizway was retired to stud at Spendthrift Farm in 2012. He stood his first season for a fee of $15,000. His first foals reached racing age in 2015. His first winner, on August 8, was named Tizzarunner. He finished 2015 as the #21 ranked First Crop Sire, with leading earner Tiz Imaginary ($114,089).

As of July 2016, Tizway was a top 10 ranked second crop sire, whose notable offspring included stakes winner Bear'sway.

In June 2017, Spendthrift Farm sold Tizway to stand at stud in South Korea, along with fellow former Spendthrift sire Archarcharch. As part of the sale deal, both horses will return to the U.S. when their breeding careers are over.

Pedigree

Tizway is inbred 5S × 4D to Intentionally, meaning Intentionally appears once in the 5th generation of the sire's side of the pedigree and once in the 4th generation of the dam's side. Tizway is also inbred 5S × 5S × 4D × 5D to Northern Dancer.

References

2005 racehorse births
Racehorses bred in Kentucky
Racehorses trained in the United States
Thoroughbred family A1
American Grade 1 Stakes winners